Provincial road N706 (N706) is a road connecting N305 near Almere with N302 near Lelystad.

External links

706
706